Robert Cushing (1841 – 11 March 1896) was a prominent Irish sculptor, active in the United States in the second half of the 19th century. According to The New York Times, his most striking work was a statue of John Christopher Drumgoole in New York City.

Life and career

Cushing was born in County Tipperary, Ireland, in 1841. He emigrated to the United States, arriving in New York City. He studied under Randolph Rogers in Rome, Italy, for a period.

He had an office at 44 West 30th Street in Manhattan's Tenderloin district.

Cushing had one child, a daughter, with his wife, who died several years before him.

In 1894, his most notable piece of work, a statue of compatriot Father John Christopher Drumgoole, was erected in Lafayette Place, New York City. It was moved to the Old Church of St. Joachim and St. Anne, Mount Loretto, in 1920.

Death
Cushing died on 11 March 1896, aged 55. The sign he had left on his office door read: "Called away by an important engagement. Back at 3 P.M. tomorrow." He had left to go to St. Vincent's Hospital, and expected to be back at work the following day; however, he experienced "heart trouble", which, coupled with "other ailments", led to his death. He was buried in Calvary Cemetery, Queens. Only a couple of his most intimate acquaintances know of his health problems.

Selected works
Below is a selection of Cushing's works, which are believed to number around 500 in total.

Equitable Building grouping, New York City
William Morrill Wadley statue, Terminal Station, Macon, Georgia (1885)
Bust of Cardinal McCloskey, St. Patrick's Cathedral, New York City
Father Drumgoole statue, Mission of the Immaculate Virgin, Lafayette Place, New York City (1894) - moved to Mount Loretto in 1920
John Kelly statue, Tammany Hall, New York City
Millard Fillmore bust, Senate chamber, Washington, D.C. (1895)

References

1841 births
1896 deaths
Irish sculptors
19th-century Irish sculptors
People from County Tipperary
People from New York City